H. N. Golibar or Bholabhai Golibar, also known by his pen name Atom Golibar, is editor of Gujarati weekly Chakram Chandan. He is also prolific Gujarati pulp fiction writer who writes mostly horror and crime thrillers.

Life
Golibar was born 24 November 1949 at Ahmedabad, India in Kutchi Memon family. He completed the Bachelor of Arts in English literature and a Diploma in Journalism. He later completed a Diploma in Printing from the Heidelberg Pressman School in West Germany. In 1971, Golibar joined his father Noormohammad Jussabhai Golibar, better known as N. J. Golibar, who published Chakram weekly since 1947 from Ahmedabad. The magazine was later renamed Chakram Chandan and stopped accepting advertisements in 1976, a practice still continues. H. N. Golibar edits and writes several columns in his weekly which does not have any advertisement revenue and solely depends on his readers.

Works
He is prolific Gujarati pulp fiction writer who has written more than 85 books, mostly crime and horror fictions.

His books include Jantar Mantar (1985), Khel Khatarnaak (1993), Janamteep (1993), Alla balla (1993), Raatrani (1993), Kal Kundali (1993), Bhoot Palit (1994), Jinnaat (1994), Chhaya Padchhaya (1995), Kaaman Tuman (1997), Santakukdi (1997), Shukan Apshukan (1998), Nilja Karanth (1998), Khelando (1998), Herapheri (2001), Bhoot Pishach (2001), Dhummas (2001), Sohaganna Sapna (2002), File Number Satso Saat (2002), Varasdar (2003), Chhal Chhalochhal (2003), Jallad (2003), Shikanjo (2003), Padchhaya Motna (2003), Ghor Aghori (2004), 31 December (2004), Pagala Pachhal Pagala (2004), Tarap (2009), Dankh (2009), Malin Mantar (2009), Chahera Mahora (1995), Saapsidi (1995) are his social novels. He publishes science monthly Science City. 
He answers questions humorously in weekly column Gajab Jawabo in Navgujarat Samay, a Gujarati daily.

See also
 List of Gujarati-language writers

References

1949 births
Gujarati-language writers
Pulp fiction writers
Indian male novelists
Writers from Ahmedabad
20th-century Indian novelists
Indian magazine editors
Indian horror writers
Indian crime fiction writers
Living people
Novelists from Gujarat
Indian thriller writers
20th-century Indian male writers